Nationality words link to articles with information on the nation's poetry or literature (for instance, Irish or France).

Events
 John Dryden made a member of the Royal Society

Works published

Great Britain
 Sir Aston Cockayne, Poems, second edition of Small Poems of Divers Sorts 1658
 John Dryden, To My Lord Chancellor, Presented on New-Years-Day
 Michael Wigglesworth, The Day of Doom or a Poetical Description of the Great and Last Judgment, a "doggerel epitome of Calvinistic theology", according to the anthology, Colonial Prose and Poetry (1903), that "attained immediately a phenomenal popularity. Eighteen hundred copies were sold within a year, and for the next century it held a secure place in [New England] Puritan households. As late as 1828 it was stated that many aged persons were still alive who could repeat it, as it had been taught them with their catechism; and the more widely one reads in the voluminous sermons of that generation, the more fair will its representation of prevailing theology in New England appear." English-born clergyman published in New England.

Other
 Jean de La Fontaine, Ode au roi ("Ode to the King"), which defends Nicolas Fouquet, France
 Michel de Marolles, Traité du poème épique, France
 Jacob Steendam, Praise of New Netherland, Dutch, Colonial American
 Joost van den Vondel, Joannes de Boetgezant ("John the Baptist"), epic, Dutch

Births
Death years link to the corresponding "[year] in poetry" article:
 October 6 (bapt.) - William Walsh (died 1708), English poet and critic
 December 17 - Samuel Wesley (died 1735), English poet and religious leader
 Naitō Jōsō (died 1704), Japanese Genroku period haiku poet, a principal disciple of Bashō
 John Smith (died 1717), English poet and playwright

Deaths
Birth years link to the corresponding "[year] in poetry" article:
 March 28 - Pierre de Boissat (born 1603), French soldier, writer, poet and translator
 March 30 - François le Métel de Boisrobert (born 1592), French

See also

 Poetry
 List of years in poetry
 17th century in poetry
 17th century in literature
 Restoration literature

Notes

17th-century poetry
Poetry